The 1984 Pepsi Canadian Junior Men's Curling Championship was held February 19 to 25, 1984 at the Assiniboine Memorial Curling Club in Winnipeg, Manitoba. The host Manitoba team, skipped by Bob Ursel (of Winnipeg) won the event, defeating British Columbia (skipped by Rob Houston) in the finals. For winning the event, Ursel and his team of Brent Mendella, Gerald Chick and brother Mike Ursel earned a spot representing Canada at the 1985 World Junior Curling Championships, where they won a gold medal.

Round Robin Standings
Final standings

Playoffs

Semifinal
February 24, 1984

Final

References

Canadian Junior Curling Championships
Curling competitions in Winnipeg
Canadian Junior Curling Championships
Canadian Junior Men's Curling Championship
Canadian Junior Men's Curling Championship